Świętego Jana Street (Polish: Ulica Świętego Jana, lit. St. John's Street) - a historic street in Kraków, Poland. 

The street begins in the south by the Main Square northwards to where it is closed off by the Church of the Transfiguration of Jesus by Pijarska Street. The name of the street derives from the Church St. John the Baptist and St. John the Evangelist, first being recorded in the fourteenth-century as platea S. Joannie Baptistae. 

The street features several magnate palaces of the Czartoryski, Lubomirski, Popielów and Wodzicki szlachta families. The street is known for holding several funeral processions, inter alia of Józef Ignacy Kraszewski and Mikołaj Zyblikiewicz in 1887, and Stanisław Wyspiański in 1907.

Features

References

Jana
Odonyms referring to religion